The British Virgin Islands competed at the 2011 Pan American Games iheld n Guadalajara, Mexico from October 14 to 30, 2011. The British Virgin Islands qualified just three athletes, the smallest of the forty-two nations competing.

Athletics 

The British Virgin Islands sent three athletes.

Men

References

Nations at the 2011 Pan American Games
P
2011